Marly-le-Roi is a commune in the Yvelines department in the administrative region of Île-de-France, France. It is located in the western suburbs of Paris,  from the centre of Paris.

Marly-le-Roi was the location of the Château de Marly, the famous leisure residence of the Sun King Louis XIV which was destroyed after the French Revolution. The Marly-le-Roi National Estate and Park now occupies much of the grounds of the former château, including restored waterways and lawns.

Demographics
The inhabitants are called Marlychois or less commonly Marlésiens.

Transport
Marly-le-Roi is served by Marly-le-Roi station on the Transilien Paris-Saint-Lazare suburban rail line.

International relations

Marly-le-Roi is twinned with:
 Kita, Mali
 Leichlingen, Germany
 Marlow, England, United Kingdom
 Viseu, Portugal

See also
 Communes of the Yvelines department
 Château de Marly
 Machine de Marly
 Marly series - Paintings of Marly by Alfred Sisley

References

Communes of Yvelines